Rands is an unincorporated community in Calhoun County, Iowa, in the United States.

History
Rands was founded in 1891. Rands' population was 12 in 1902.

References

Unincorporated communities in Calhoun County, Iowa
Unincorporated communities in Iowa